Paul Geary (born July 24, 1961 in Medford, Massachusetts) is an American rock and roll drummer and Artist Manager.  He is a co-founder and drummer of the Rock band Extreme.  He left the group in 1994 to pursue a career in artist management.  He was succeeded by former Annihilator drummer Michael Mangini, who is currently the drummer for Dream Theater.

Geary founded Global Artist Management in Boston in 1995. One of his first signings was a then little-known Boston rock band Godsmack who would go on to sell more than 15 million albums under his watch. Geary ran Global Artist Management for 10 years before it was acquired by music mogul Irving Azoff in 2005.

Geary worked alongside Azoff and Jared Paul at "AGP" (for Azoff, Geary, Paul) Management (a division of Front Line Management Group) until January 2013, at which time Azoff resigned from the company, and Geary and his staff returned to operate under the moniker "Global Artist Management".

Geary's artist management credits include Smashing Pumpkins, Alter Bridge, Godsmack, Creed, The Scorpions, Fuel, Steel Panther, Jason Bonham, Billy Ray Cyrus, Hoobastank, Joe Perry ("The Joe Perry Project"), and his former band Extreme.

Global Artist Management signed on to co-manage Hollywood Vampires with Shep Gordon in 2017. Principal members of the Vampires include Joe Perry, Johnny Depp, and Alice Cooper.

In June 2019, The Hollywood Reporter and other major publications announced that Global Artist Management signed on to manage Johnny Depp's musical career.

In May 2020, Paul Geary and Global Artist Management joined with Shelter Music Group to expand the already impressive Shelter roster which includes Fleetwood Mac, ZZ Top, Barenaked Ladies, and Puscifer.

References

American rock drummers
1961 births
Living people
Extreme (band) members
People from Medford, Massachusetts
20th-century American drummers
American male drummers
20th-century American male musicians